Une nuit agitée (English: An Agitated Night) is a 1912 short film directed by and starring Max Linder. The story was by Linder and fellow film colleague Louis Feuillade. The film was produced and distributed by the Pathé Frères company.

Cast
Max Linder
Stacia Napierkowska
Jane Renouardt

External links

Une nuit agitée available for free download at Internet Archive

1912 films
Films directed by Max Linder
1912 short films
French silent short films
French comedy short films
French black-and-white films